Jamraniwah railway station is located in Lodhran district, Punjab province, Pakistan.

References

External links

Railway stations in Lodhran District
Railway stations on Lodhran–Raiwind Line